The following is a list of massacres that have occurred in Finland (numbers may be approximate):

See also
 List of massacres in the Finnish Civil War

References

Finland
Massacres

Massacres